Dianké Makha is an arrondissement of Goudiry Department  in Tambacounda Region in Senegal.

References 

Arrondissements of Senegal